Robin Ganemyr (born 25 June 1983) is a retired Swedish footballer who played as a midfielder.

References

External links

Eliteprospects profile 
Robin Ganemyr at Fotbolltransfers

1983 births
Living people
Association football midfielders
Swedish footballers
Allsvenskan players
Superettan players
IK Oddevold players